Mount Popomanaseu is a volcanic mountain and the highest mountain in the Solomon Islands. It is located on Guadalcanal east of Mount Makarakomburu. At , it is the highest peak in the insular South Pacific, excluding New Guinea and its satellite islands. Panning east across the South Pacific, there is no higher mountain until reaching the Andes in South America. The summit is a saddle plateau and can be seen on the range above Henderson airfield. It holds significant cultural importance for the indigenous people and supports vital habitat for many endemic and restricted range species on Guadalcanal.

See also
 List of Ultras of Oceania

References

Popomanaseu
Highest points of countries
Popomanaseu